Azerbaijan competed at the 2012 Summer Paralympics in London, United Kingdom from August 29 to September 9, 2012.

Medallists

Archery

Women

|-
|align=left|Zinyat Valiyeva
|align=left|Ind. recurve W1/W2
|435
|19
| (14) L 0-6
|colspan=5|did not advance
|}

Athletics

Men

Women

Judo

Men

Women

Powerlifting

Men

Shooting 

Men

Women

Swimming

Women

See also
Azerbaijan at the Paralympics
Azerbaijan at the 2012 Summer Olympics

Notes

Nations at the 2012 Summer Paralympics
2012
Paralympics